There are numerous experimental stations all over the world. Some of them include: 

DuPont Experimental Station
Seaplane Experimental Station
Rothamsted Experimental Station
Air Ministry Experimental Station
Cold Spring Harbor Laboratory
Experimental Station for Landscape Plants
UC Citrus Experiment Station
Agricultural experiment station
New York State Agricultural Experiment Station
Marine Aircraft Experimental Station
Pavlovsk Experimental Station
Tesla Experimental Station
Tocklai Experimental Station